Frankenberg (also: Frankenberg/Sa.) is a town in the district of Mittelsachsen, in Saxony, Germany.

It was the site of the Nazi concentration camp Sachsenburg.

Sons and daughters of the city 
 Christian Gottlob Höpner (1799–1859), composer and organist
 Franz Kuhn (1884-1961), lawyer, sinologist and translator
 Eberhard Vogel (born 1943), record footballer of the GDR
 Jochen Sachse (born 1948), hammer thrower and Olympic medalist
 Sonja Morgenstern (born 1955), figure skater 
 Matthias Weichert (born 1955), operatic baritone
 Anett Fiebig (born 1961), swimmer
 Anja Möllenbeck (born 1972), discus thrower
 Peer Kluge (born 1980), footballer

References 

 
Mittelsachsen